Circa B.C. is a DVD released by the Scottish band Albannach in 2007. The DVD features footage from live concerts and band interviews; it was mostly recorded at Mugdock Castle in Scotland.

Track listing

Credits

 Jamesie Johnston - Bass Drum, Vocals, Bodhrán
 Donnie MacNeill - Bagpipes, Drums
 Jacquie Holland - Drums, Percussion, Vocals
 Kyle Gray - Lead Drums
 Aya Thorne - Bodhrán, Percussion
 Davey 'Ramone' Morrison - Bodhrán, Vocals, Whistles

External links
 Albannach Band Website www.albannachmusic.com
 Sample Tracks on ShoutCAST

Albannach (band) albums
2007 video albums
Live video albums
2007 live albums